The Sandstone station of Sandstone, Minnesota was built in 1895 and served the Great Northern Railway and successor Burlington Northern until 1971.  Passenger service ceased upon the formation of Amtrak, but resumed between Minneapolis and Superior in 1975.  Sandstone was served by the Arrowhead and later the North Star between Chicago and Duluth.  Service ceased after April 7, 1985. The depot still exists, but has been relocated from the tracks.

References

External links
Sandstone, Minnesota – TrainWeb

Former Amtrak stations in Minnesota
Former Great Northern Railway (U.S.) stations
1895 establishments in Minnesota
Railway stations in the United States opened in 1895
Railway stations closed in 1971
Railway stations in the United States opened in 1975
Railway stations closed in 1985